Dan Stroup (born December 18, 1968 in Vancouver, British Columbia) is a coach for the Washington Stealth of the National Lacrosse League. Prior to his retirement, Stroup played for several teams over a 13-season career which included winning the Champion's Cup four times: three (1999, 2000, and 2002) with the Toronto Rock, and one (2006) with the Colorado Mammoth.

Statistics

NLL
Reference:

Awards

References

1968 births
Living people
Canadian lacrosse players
Colorado Mammoth players
Edmonton Rush players
National Lacrosse League All-Stars
Portland LumberJax players
Sportspeople from Vancouver
Toronto Rock players